Ben Oas (April 27, 1901 – February 1, 1976) was an American football player. 

Oas was born in 1901 in  Minnesota. He played college football as a center and fullback for St Mary's (MN) from 1925 to 1928. He also played center for the St. Mary's basketball team.

Oas also played professional football in the National Football League (NFL) as a center and back for the Minneapolis Red Jackets during the 1929 season. He appeared in seven NFL games, four as a starter.

Oas died in February 1976 in Trimble, Illinois.

References

1901 births
1976 deaths
Minneapolis Red Jackets players
Players of American football from Minnesota